Yongjing can refer to the following places:

Yongjing County, a county in Linxia Prefecture, Gansu, China
Yongjing, Changhua, a rural township in Changhua County, Taiwan
Yongjing (1756-1757), 13th son of Qianlong Emperor and Empress Nara